The 1942–43 SK Rapid Wien season was the 45th season in club history.

Squad

Squad and statistics

Squad statistics

Fixtures and results

Gauliga

Tschammerpokal

References

1942-43 Rapid Wien Season
Rapid